VSS Imagine (Virgin Space Ship Imagine), is a SpaceShip III class suborbital rocket-powered crewed spaceplane. It is the first SpaceShip III to be built and will be used as part of the Virgin Galactic fleet. The spacecraft was rolled out 30 March 2021 and was planned to undergo ground and glide testing during summer 2021. Although as of spring 2022 it has not yet flown.

Overview 
VSS Imagine, the first SpaceShip III suborbital spaceplane for Virgin Galactic was announced on 25 February 2021 and was rolled out 30 March 2021. It is one of two SpaceShip III class spacecraft on order by Virgin Galactic, the second being VSS Inspire.

References

Virgin Galactic
Individual spaceplanes
American spacecraft
Suborbital spaceflight
Crewed spacecraft
Rocket-powered aircraft
Space tourism
Vehicles introduced in 2021
Experimental vehicles